Tobias Fankhauser is a Swiss paralympic cyclist. He participated at the 2012 Summer Paralympics in the cycling competition, being awarded the silver medal in the men's road race H1 event. Fankhauser also participated at the 2016 Summer Paralympics in the cycling competition, being awarded the bronze medal in the men's road race H2 event.

References

External links 
Paralympic Games profile

Living people
Place of birth missing (living people)
Year of birth missing (living people)
Swiss male cyclists
Cyclists at the 2012 Summer Paralympics
Cyclists at the 2016 Summer Paralympics
Medalists at the 2012 Summer Paralympics
Medalists at the 2016 Summer Paralympics
Paralympic medalists in cycling
Paralympic cyclists of Switzerland
Paralympic bronze medalists for Switzerland
Paralympic silver medalists for Switzerland